Meruoca is a municipality in the state of Ceará in the Northeast region of Brazil.

History
The unclassified extinct Arariú language was spoken around Meruoca on the Acatajú River.

See also
List of municipalities in Ceará

References

Municipalities in Ceará